The 5th Parliament of Lower Canada was in session from April 10, 1809, to May 18, 1809. Elections to the Legislative Assembly in Lower Canada had been held in May 1808. Lieutenant-governor James Henry Craig prorogued the house following the expulsion of Ezekiel Hart by the assembly and the introduction of a bill barring judges from becoming members of the house; he also hoped to reduce representation by the Parti canadien in the election that would follow. All sessions were held at Quebec City.

References

External links
  Assemblée nationale du Québec (French)
Journals of the House of Assembly of Lower Canada ..., John Neilson (1809)

05
1809 establishments in Lower Canada
1809 disestablishments in Lower Canada